Francis Eugene George  (January 16, 1937 – April 17, 2015) was an American prelate of the Catholic Church. He was the eighth Archbishop of Chicago in Illinois (1997–2014) and previously served as bishop of the Diocese of Yakima and Archbishop of Portland.

A member of the Missionary Oblates of Mary Immaculate, George was created a cardinal by Pope John Paul II in 1998. He served as president of the United States Conference of Catholic Bishops (USCCB) from 2007 to 2010.

On September 20, 2014, Pope Francis accepted George's resignation and appointed Bishop Blase J. Cupich to succeed him as Archbishop of Chicago. In this unusual circumstance, George was permitted to remain as the incumbent archbishop until Cupich was installed to succeed him on November 18, 2014. George had been diagnosed with cancer in 2006 and died from the disease in 2015.

Biography

Early life 
Francis George was born on January 16, 1937, in Chicago, Illinois, to Francis J. and Julia R. (née McCarthy) George. He had an older sister, Margaret. He received his early education at the parochial school of St. Pascal Parish in Chicago's Northwest Side.

George contracted polio at age 13, leaving him with a permanent limp.  Archbishop Quigley Preparatory Seminary in Chicago, rejected George for admission due to his limp.  He instead enrolled at St. Henry Preparatory Seminary in Belleville, Illinois, a high school seminary of the Missionary Oblates of Mary Immaculate. He joined the Oblates on August 14, 1957. He continued his studies at the Oblates novitiate in Godfrey, Illinois, before entering Our Lady of the Snows Seminary in Pass Christian, Mississippi.

George was then sent to study theology at the University of Ottawa in Canada. He made his solemn vows as a member of the Oblates on September 8, 1961.

Priesthood 
On December 21, 1963, George was ordained to the priesthood for the Oblates by Bishop Raymond Hillinger at  St. Pascal Church. He received a Bachelor of Theology degree from the University of Ottawa in 1964, followed by a Master of Philosophy degree from The Catholic University of America in Washington, D.C. in 1965. George then taught philosophy at Our Lady of the Snows Seminary (1964–69), Tulane University in New Orleans, Louisiana (1968), and Creighton University in Omaha, Nebraska (1969–1973).

During his teaching assignments, George earned a Doctor of Philosophy degree in American philosophy from Tulane University in 1970, and a Master of Theology degree from the University of Ottawa in 1971. He served as provincial superior of the Midwestern Province for the Oblates in Saint Paul, Minnesota, from 1973 until 1974, when he became the Oblates vicar general. Based in Rome, George served as vicar general for 12 years. He obtained a Doctor of Sacred Theology degree from the Pontifical Urbaniana University in 1988, with a thesis entitled: "Inculturation and communion".

George returned to the United States, where he served as coordinator of the Circle of Fellows at the Center for the Study of Faith and Culture in Cambridge, Massachusetts (1987–90).

Bishop of Yakima 
On July 10, 1990, George was appointed the fifth Bishop of Yakima by Pope John Paul II. He received his episcopal consecration on September 21, 1990, from Archbishop Agostino Cacciavillan, with Bishops Roger Schwietz and William S. Skylstad serving as co-consecrators, at Holy Family Church in Yakima. He took as his episcopal motto: Christo Gloria in Ecclesia (Latin: "To Christ be Glory in the Church").

George served as bishop of Yakima for five and a half years. As a member of the USCCB, he served as chair of the Commission for Bishops and Scholars (1992–1994), and as a consultant to the Committees on Evangelization (1991–93), Hispanic Affairs (1994–97), and Science and Values (1994–97). George was an episcopal advisor to the Cursillo Movement (Region XII) from 1990 to 1997, and episcopal moderator of the National Catholic Office for Persons with Disabilities from 1990 to 2008. He was a papal appointee to the 1994 World Synod of Bishops on Consecrated Life, and attended the Ninth Ordinary Assembly of the Synod of Bishops in Vatican City in October 1994.

Archbishop of Portland 
On April 30, 1996, George was appointed the ninth archbishop of the Archdiocese of Portland. He was installed on the following May 27 at St. Mary's Cathedral of the Immaculate Conception in Portland, Oregon.  During his brief tenure, he led the archdiocese's response to a tape recording by the Lane County jail of an inmate's sacramental confession; the Ninth Circuit Court of Appeals later ruled that the tape recording was an unconstitutional and illegal act.

Archbishop of Chicago 
On April 8, 1997, Pope John Paul II appointed George as the eighth archbishop of Chicago, filling the vacancy left by the death of Cardinal Joseph Bernardin on November 14, 1996. George was the first native Chicagoan to become archbishop there. On May 7, 1997, Apostolic Pro-Nuncio Agostino Cacciavillan installed George as archbishop of Chicago in Holy Name Cathedral in Chicago.

On January 18, 1998, Pope John Paul II announced George's elevation to the College of Cardinals with the title of cardinal-priest of San Bartolomeo all'Isola, which occurred at the consistory at the Vatican on February 21.

George addressed the archdiocese's annual Theology on Tap gathering in 1997. In his invitation to the event, he wrote, "You are very important members of the Church. Your energy, talent and faith will give me much help as together we build up our local Church to be a vital presence in the Chicago area. Together we can continue the mission of Jesus Christ to bring the Gospel of love, forgiveness and holiness to all the places where we live and encounter others."

As a cardinal elector, George participated in the 2005 papal conclave that selected Pope Benedict XVI and the papal conclave of 2013 that selected Pope Francis.

In March 2009, George met with newly elected U.S. President Barack Obama. In Fall 2010, George finished his three-year presidency of the USCCB.

In 2011, George terminated the foster care program of Catholic Charities of the Archdiocese of Chicago.  The State of Illinois had ruled that it would not provide funding to any charities that refused to consider same-sex couples as foster care providers or adoptive parents.  George refused to comply with this requirement.

Viewpoints

Interfaith relations
In 2007, George asked Jews to reconsider descriptions of Jesus in the Talmud as a "bastard" in exchange for a softening of traditional Catholic prayers calling for Jews to be converted to Christianity. In 2009, he condemned comments denying the existence of the Holocaust that were made by Bishop Richard Williamson.

Religious freedom 

In February 2010, George spoke at Brigham Young University about the need for Catholics and the Church of Jesus Christ of Latter-day Saints (LDS) to stand together to protect religious freedom. "In recent years, Catholics and members of The Church of Jesus Christ of Latter-day Saints have stood more frequently side by side in the public square to defend human life and dignity," George also praised the LDS for its efforts to combat poverty and pornography and the need to define marriage as between one man and one woman.

George further outlined in October 2010 how he believed religious freedoms in the United States and other Western societies were endangered. In a speech to a group of priests, he said, "I expect to die in bed, my successor will die in prison and his successor will die a martyr in the public square. His successor will pick up the shards of a ruined society and slowly help rebuild civilization, as the church has done so often in human history." The quote was originally published online without the second sentence. In a 2014 interview, George said:

LGBT rights
When a new route was proposed for the 2012 annual Chicago Pride Parade that would take it past a Catholic church, George told an interviewer: "you don't want the Gay Liberation Movement to morph into something like the Ku Klux Klan, demonstrating in the streets against Catholicism." In response, LGBT advocates in Chicago called for George's resignation, but George said: "When the pastor's request for reconsideration of the plans was ignored, the organizers invited an obvious comparison to other groups who have historically attempted to stifle the religious freedom of the Catholic Church." Two weeks later, George apologized: "This has evidently wounded a good number of people. I have family members myself who are gay and lesbian, so it's part of our lives. So I'm sorry for the hurt." He said he was "speaking out of fear that I have for the church's liberty and I was reaching for an analogy which was very inappropriate ...Sometimes fear is a bad motivation." LGBT rights advocates accepted his apology.

On January 1, 2013, in a pastoral letter to the archdiocese, George stated that the passage of a same-sex marriage legislation in Illinois, which appeared imminent, would be "acting against the common good of society. This proposed legislation will have long-term consequences because laws teach; they tell us what is socially acceptable and what is not, and most people conform to the dictates of their respective society, at least in the short run".

In September 2014, in his column in The Catholic New World, George alleged that the US Government and society were now approving sexual relationships so at odds with Catholic teaching that "the church's teaching on these issues is now evidence of intolerance for what the civil law upholds and even imposes" and that "those who do not conform to the official religion, we are warned, place their citizenship in danger." He also cited the requirements of the Affordable Care Act. He wrote that:"It already means in some States that those who run businesses must conform their activities to the official religion or be fined, as Christians and Jews are fined for their religion in countries governed by Sharia law."Later in September 2014, George met with a gay music director of a Catholic parish who had been fired after announcing his intention to marry his partner. The man said of the meeting: "I was just again grateful for the opportunity to meet with him, for him to know me, for him to hear my story. ...I think the overall tone was again pastoral."

Extra-diocesan posts

Vatican appointments 
Pope John Paul II appointed George to several offices of the Roman Curia:

Congregation for Divine Worship and the Discipline of the Sacraments
Congregation for Institutes of Consecrated Life and Societies of Apostolic Life
Congregation for the Evangelization of Peoples
Pontifical Commission for the Cultural Heritage of the Church
Congregation for the Oriental Churches
Pontifical Council for Culture
Pontifical Council Cor Unum

George was appointed by Pope John Paul II to the 1994 World Synod of Bishops on Consecrated Life and a delegate and one of two special secretaries at the Synod of Bishops for America in 1997.  In 2010, Pope Benedict XVI appointed George to the Pontifical Commission for the Study of the Organizational and Economic Problems of the Holy See.

U.S. Conference of Catholic Bishops 
George served as USCCB vice president (2004–2007) and president (2007–2010). He served as a member, and later as a consultant, to the Committee on Divine Worship; he was also a consultant to the Committee on Doctrine and Pro-Life Activities and the Subcommittee on Lay Ministry. George had also served on the committees on Doctrine, on Latin America, on Missions, on Religious Life, the American Board of Catholic Missions, and on World Missions; on the Ad Hoc Committee to Oversee the Use of the Catechism and the Subcommittee on Campus Ministry.

George was chair of the Committee for Bishops and Scholars from 1992–1994, and of the Committee on Liturgy from 2001–2004, and a consultant to the Committees on Evangelization (1991–1993), Hispanic Affairs (1994–1997), Science and Values (1994–1997), and African American Catholics (1999–2002). He was the representative to the International Commission on English and the Liturgy from 1997–2006.

George was a USCCB delegate to the 2001 World Synod of Bishops and was also elected to the Council for the World Synod  in 2001, he served as a delegate to the 2008 World Synod of Bishops on "The Word of God in the Life and Mission of the Church.

Catholic organizations 
As archbishop, George was the defacto chancellor of the University of St. Mary of the Lake/Mundelein Seminary in Mundelein, Illinois. He served as chancellor from 1997 to 2014 of the Catholic Church Extension Society.  George served as episcopal liaison to the Catholic Campus Ministry Association executive board and was episcopal moderator for the Ministry of Transportation Chaplains from 2003. He also served as episcopal advisor to the Cursillo Movement, Region XII, from 1990 to 1997. From 1990 to 2008, George was episcopal moderator and board member of the National Catholic Office for Persons with Disabilities.  In July 2011, George served as a catechist at the August 2011 World Youth Day celebration in Madrid, Spain.

George served on the board of trustees of the Catholic University of America and the  Papal Foundation. In 1994, George became a board member of the National Catholic Bioethics Center in Philadelphia, Pennsylvania. He served on the board of directors of the Basilica of the National Shrine of the Immaculate Conception in Washington, D.C. and a member of the Kohl McCormick Early Childhood Teaching Awards advisory board. He served on the board of directors of Oblate Media in Belleville, Illinois.

Associations and honors 
George served as conventual chaplain ad honorem of the Federal Association of the Sovereign Military Order of Malta and grand prior of the North Central Lieutenancy of the United States for the Order of the Holy Sepulchre of Jerusalem,  George belonged to the American Catholic Philosophical Association, the American Society of Missiologists, and the Catholic Commission on Intellectual and Cultural Affairs.

George received an honorary doctorate from Lewis University in Romeoville, Illinois, on May 18, 2014. On December 10, 2014, George received the Medal of Merit, the highest honor of the City of Chicago.

Retirement
On January 16, 2012, George submitted his letter of resignation as archbishop of the Archdiocese of Chicago to Pope Benedict XVI,  having reached the mandatory retirement age of 75. He named Monsignor Peter F. Śnieg, rector of St. Joseph's Seminary at Loyola University Chicago, as moderator of the curia for the archdiocese. At that time, George anticipated remaining in office for two to three years.

In a 2014 interview on his retirement, George said:

In the same 2014 interview, when asked if he saw himself as conservative, George replied:

Final illness
George was diagnosed with an aggressive but localized form of bladder cancer in 2006. In August 2012, the archdiocese announced that his bladder cancer had metastasized to  his kidney and liver, and that he would undergo chemotherapy. The cancer returned in March 2014 and George started another round of chemotherapy. He was hospitalized for several days at Loyola University Medical Center in Chicago  after showing flu-like symptoms and signs of dehydration. In April 2014, on medical advice, George canceled a trip to the Vatican. George and the apostolic nuncio to the United States, Archbishop Carlo Maria Vigano, agreed that the Holy See should start looking for his successor.

In August 2014, George entered a clinical trial of a new cancer treatment drug at the University of Chicago. George left the trial at the end of 2014 due to the lack of positive results. On Friday, January 30, 2015, George told reporters that he would now receive palliative care.On March 3, 2015, George entered Loyola University Medical Center for tests. On March 28, he was readmitted for pain management and hydration. On April 3, he was released.On September 20, 2014, Pope Francis accepted George's resignation as archbishop of Chicago and named Bishop Blase J. Cupich as his successor.

Francis George died of cancer on April 17, 2015, in the archdiocesan residence in Chicago at age 78.

Memorial services
A Mass of Christian burial for George was celebrated on April 23, 2015, at Holy Name Cathedral. The burial service took place at All Saints Cemetery in Des Plaines, Illinois, where he was buried in the George family plot per his wishes. Archbishop J. Peter Sartain  gave the homily at George's request. Archbishop Roger Schweitz led the rites at the end of the mass. Nine cardinals, Archbishop Vigano, and over fifty bishops concelebrated the mass.

On April 25, 2015, a memorial mass for George was held at his titular church, San Bartolomeo all'Isola, in Rome.  Reverend Andrew Liaugminas, an archdiocesan priest ordained by George in 2010, was the homilist. Cardinal Bernard Law presided, joined by Cardinals James Harvey, George Pell, and J. Francis Stafford. A "Month's Mind Mass" was celebrated on Sunday, May 17, 2015, at Holy Name Cathedral. Rector Dan Mayall was the principal celebrant and homilist.

Legacy

Tributes
One of George's wishes had been to visit Pope Francis before he died, which he was not able to do, to his regret. While George was always careful to express his overall agreement with and obedience to Francis, he said himself that he was confused by what signals the Pope was sending. Upon hearing of his death, Pope Francis sent a telegram of condolence to Archbishop Cupich:

The Cardinal Secretary of State, Pietro Parolin, also sent a telegram of condolence.

The USCCB president, Archbishop Joseph Kurtz paid tribute to him, since George had served as its President. Many Bishops and Archbishops who had served under him, including Archbishops Gustavo Garcia-Siller of San Antonio and Jerome Listecki of Milwaukee, and Bishop Gerald Kicanas of Tucson, also sent their condolences, as did some who had served with him, including Cardinal Timothy Dolan of New York City (his successor as USCCB President) and Archbishop Wilton Gregory of Atlanta (who had served under George's predecessor, Cardinal Bernardin, as an Auxiliary Bishop, and under them both as Bishop of Belleville, Illinois). Many prelates and public officials were expected to attend his funeral.

Chicago Mayor Rahm Emanuel stated: "Cardinal Francis George led a remarkable life of faith and service. As Chicago's first native-born Archbishop, his journey took him full-circle from growing up in Portage Park to serving in far-flung missions around the globe, and eventually back home to shepherd the City of Chicago towards a better future. He lent his counsel to those in distress, his comfort to those in despair and he inspired us all with his courage in his final days. He could always be counted on to provide those granite qualities to the countless people who relied on them when it mattered the most."Illinois Governor Bruce Rauner stated: "He shepherded the church through some of its most trying times, but leaves behind a strong community of faith that has tremendous positive impact on the people of Illinois, regardless of their creed."

Canonization 
Having died in April 2015 without a waiver from the Holy See (usually given to martyrs or other very esteemed individuals), the earliest that the archdiocese could open George's cause for canonization was 2020. There has been a formal petition presented to his successor, Cardinal Cupich, to allow the gathering of petitions, of opinions, and of preliminary information.

Publications

Books 
 The Difference God Makes: A Catholic Vision of Faith, Communion, and Culture, was published in October 2009 by Crossroad Publishing Company.  
 God in Action: How Faith in God Can Address the Challenges of the World, was published in May 2011 by Doubleday Religion. 
 A Godly Humanism: Clarifying the Hope that Lies Within, published by CUA Press, was completed just nine  days before his death in 2015.

Pastoral letters 

 Becoming An Evangelizing People was released on November 21, 1997. 
 Dwell in My Love, on the sinful and destructive nature of racism, was released on April 4, 2001.

Columns 
George published a bi-monthly column in the archdiocesan newspaper, The Catholic New World, called "The Cardinal's Column".

See also

 Catholic Church hierarchy
 Catholic Church in the United States
 Historical list of the Catholic bishops of the United States
 List of Catholic bishops of the United States
 Lists of patriarchs, archbishops, and bishops

References

External links
 
 Cardinal George Fanclub – news coverage, commentary & resources
 Archdiocese of Chicago  – official site
 Catholic New World Newspaper
 Parish Directory
 Quotes by Cardinal Francis George, OMI - Quotes
 Quotes by others about Cardinal Francis George, OMI - Quotes by others about ... 
 George's catholic-pages bio

1937 births
2015 deaths
21st-century American cardinals
Roman Catholic archbishops of Chicago
Roman Catholic archbishops of Portland in Oregon
Cardinals created by Pope John Paul II
20th-century American cardinals
Creighton University alumni
Members of the Pontifical Council for Culture
Members of the Congregation for Divine Worship and the Discipline of the Sacraments
Members of the Congregation for Institutes of Consecrated Life and Societies of Apostolic Life
Members of the Congregation for the Evangelization of Peoples
Members of the Congregation for the Oriental Churches
Missionary Oblates of Mary Immaculate
Oregon clergy
Saint Paul University alumni
Pontifical Urban University alumni
Roman Catholic bishops of Yakima
Catholic University of America alumni
University of Ottawa alumni
Tulane University alumni
People with polio
Deaths from bladder cancer
Deaths from cancer in Illinois
Writers from Chicago
Members of the Order of the Holy Sepulchre